In inorganic chemistry, sulfonyl halide groups occur when a sulfonyl functional group is singly bonded to a halogen atom. They have the general formula , where X is a halogen. The stability of sulfonyl halides decreases in the order fluorides > chlorides > bromides > iodides, all four types being well known.  The sulfonyl chlorides and fluorides are of dominant importance in this series.

Structure
Sulfonyl halides have tetrahedral sulfur centres attached to two oxygen atoms, an organic radical, and a halide. In a representative example, methanesulfonyl chloride, the S=O, S−C, and S−Cl bond distances are respectively 142.4, 176.3, and 204.6 pm.

Sulfonyl chlorides 

Sulfonic acid chlorides, or sulfonyl chlorides, are a sulfonyl halide with the general formula .

Production
Arylsulfonyl chlorides are made industrially in a two-step, one-pot reaction from an arene (in this case, benzene) and chlorosulfuric acid:
C6H6 + HOSO2Cl -> C6H5SO3H + HCl
C6H5SO3H + HOSO2Cl -> C6H5SO2Cl + H2SO4
The intermediate benzenesulfonic acid can be chlorinated with thionyl chloride as well. Benzenesulfonyl chloride, the most important sulfonyl halide, can also be produced by treating sodium benzenesulfonate with phosphorus pentachlorides.

Benzenediazonium chloride reacts with sulfur dioxide and hydrochloric acid to give the sulfonyl chloride:
[C6H5N2]Cl + SO2 -> C6H5SO2Cl + N2

For alkylsulfonyl chlorides, one synthetic procedure is the Reed reaction:
RH + SO2 + Cl2 -> RSO2Cl + HCl

Reactions
Sulfonyl chlorides react with water to give the corresponding sulfonic acid:
RSO2Cl + H2O -> RSO3H  + HCl

These compounds react readily with many other nucleophiles as well, most notably alcohols and amines (see Hinsberg reaction). If the nucleophile is an alcohol, the product is a sulfonate ester; if it is an amine, the product is a sulfonamide. Chlorosulfonated alkanes are susceptible to crosslinking via reactions with various nucleophiles.

Sulfonyl chlorides readily undergo Friedel–Crafts reactions with arenes giving sulfones, for example:
RSO2Cl + C6H6 -> RSO2C6H5 + HCl

The desulfonation of arylsulfonyl chlorides provides a route to aryl chlorides:
ArSO2Cl -> ArCl + SO2
1,2,4-Trichlorobenzene is made industrially in this way.

Treatment of alkanesulfonyl chlorides having α-hydrogens with amine bases can give sulfenes, highly unstable species that can be trapped:
RCH2SO2Cl -> RCH=SO2

Common sulfonyl chlorides
Chlorosulfonated polyethylene (CSPE) is produced industrially by chlorosulfonation of polyethylene. CSPE is noted for its toughness, hence its use for roofing shingles.

An industrially important derivative is benzenesulfonyl chloride. In the laboratory, useful reagents include tosyl chloride, brosyl chloride, nosyl chloride and mesyl chloride.

Sulfonyl fluorides 
Sulfonyl fluorides have the general formula RSO2F. "Most, if not all" industrially synthesized perfluorooctanesulfonyl derivatives, such as PFOS, have the sulfonyl fluoride as their precursor. 

In the laboratory, sulfonyl fluorides are used in molecular biology as reactive probes. They specifically react with residues based on serine, threonine, tyrosine, lysine, cysteine, and histidine. The fluorides are more resistant than the corresponding chlorides and are therefore better suited to this task.

Sulfonyl bromides 
Sulfonyl bromides have the general formula RSO2Br. In contrast to sulfonyl chlorides, sulfonyl bromides readily undergo light-induced homolysis affording sulfonyl radicals, which can add to alkenes, as illustrated by the use of bromomethanesulfonyl bromide, BrCH2SO2Br in Ramberg–Bäcklund reaction syntheses.

Sulfonyl iodides 
Sulfonyl iodides, having the general formula RSO2I, are quite light-sensitive. Perfluoroalkanesulfonyl iodides, prepared by reaction between silver perfluoroalkanesulfinates and iodine in dichloromethane at −30 °C, react with alkenes to form the normal adducts, RFSO2CH2CHIR and the adducts resulting from loss of SO2, RFCH2CHIR. Arenesulfonyl iodides, prepared from reaction of arenesulfinates or arenehydrazides with iodine, can be used as initiators to facilitate the synthesis of poly(methyl methacrylate) containing C–I, C–Br and C–Cl chain ends.

In popular culture
In the episode "Encyclopedia Galactica" of his TV series Cosmos: A Personal Voyage, Carl Sagan speculates that some intelligent extraterrestrial beings might have a genetic code based on polyaromatic sulfonyl halides instead of DNA.

References

Functional groups